Mayachnoye is the name of several rural localities in Russia:
Mayachnoye, Ikryaninsky District, Astrakhan Oblast, a selo in Ikryaninsky District, Astrakhan Oblast
Mayachnoye, Krasnoyarsky District, Astrakhan Oblast, a selo in Krasnoyarsky District, Astrakhan Oblast